The Red River Academy (later St. John's College) in Manitoba, Canada, was established for the training and education of the sons of Hudson's Bay Company employees. It was founded in 1852 by Rev. David Jones. Many of the students were Indigenous. It was located in the Red River Colony.

Students 
Ranald MacDonald
James McKay Jr.
Angus McKay
Thomas Bunn

References 

Hudson's Bay Company
First Nations history
Red River Colony
University of Manitoba